Maria Raimundo (born on 27 July 1979), is an Angolan former professional handball player. She played with the Angolan national team at the 2000 Summer Olympics in Sydney.

References

External links
 
 Maria Raimundo at Eurosport

1979 births
Living people
Angolan female handball players
Olympic handball players of Angola
Handball players at the 2000 Summer Olympics